John MacNamee (born 31 July 1942) is a footballer who played as a winger in the Football League for Tranmere Rovers.

References

1942 births
Living people
Footballers from Edinburgh
Association football wingers
Scottish footballers
Raith Rovers F.C. players
Montrose F.C. players
Reading F.C. players
Corby Town F.C. players
Tranmere Rovers F.C. players
Altrincham F.C. players
Scottish Football League players
English Football League players